Henry Preiss is a sailplane designer.  He was a longtime friend and neighbor of Richard Schreder and they worked together to develop and build several examples each of the RHJ-7 and RHJ-8 two-seat sailplanes, and also the RHJ-9 and RHJ-10. Preiss also finished the Schreder HP-19.

The RHJ sailplanes were developed on-the-fly; neither Preiss nor Schreder kept detailed plans or design drawings, and made only what sketches were necessary for the basic engineering validation of the structure.

References 

American aerospace engineers
Living people
Year of birth missing (living people)